Bouzina District is a district of Batna Province, Algeria.

Municipalities
Bouzina
Larbaâ

Districts of Batna Province